Cynoglossus acutirostris, commonly known as the Sharpnose tongue sole is a species of tonguefish. It is commonly found in sandy waters of the western Indian Ocean, particularly the Red Sea and the Gulf of Aden.

References
Fishbase

Cynoglossidae
Fish described in 1939